Ganglion of vagus nerve may refer to:

 Inferior ganglion of vagus nerve
 Superior ganglion of vagus nerve